
Year 527 (DXXVII) was a common year starting on Friday (link will display the full calendar) of the Julian calendar. At the time, it was known as the Year of the Consulship of Mavortius without colleague (or, less frequently, year 1280 Ab urbe condita). The denomination 527 for this year has been used since the early medieval period, when the Anno Domini calendar era became the prevalent method in Europe for naming years.

Events 
 By place 
 Byzantine Empire 
 April 1 – Emperor Justin I names his nephew Justinian I as co-ruler, as an incurable wound saps his strength.
 August 1 – Justin I, age 77, dies at Constantinople and is succeeded by Justinian I, who becomes sole emperor.
 Justinian I reorganises the command structure of the Byzantine army, and fields a small but highly trained army. 
 Justinian I appoints Belisarius to command the Eastern army in Armenia and on the Byzantine-Persian frontier.

 Britannia 
 King Cerdic of Wessex and his son Cynric defeat the Britons at Cerdicesleah (modern Chearsley).
 The Kingdom of Essex is founded by the Saxons, who land north of the Thames. They take control of the land between what is now London and St Albans, ceding from the Kingdom of Kent
 Æscwine becomes the first king of Essex (approximate date), defeating Octa in battle at Hackney, west of the River Lea.

 Japan 
 Iwai Rebellion: A revolt against the Yamato court breaks out in Tsukushi Province (according to Nihon Shoki).

 By topic 
 Religion 
 Justinian I outlaws pagan religious practices in Egypt, and dispatches Byzantine missionaries to southern territories (approximate date).
 The Church of the Nativity in Bethlehem is rebuilt until 565, restoring the architectural tone of the basilica.
 Silla, one of the Three Kingdoms of Korea, formally adopts Buddhism as a state religion (approximate date).

Births

Deaths 
 August 1 – Justin I, Byzantine Emperor (b. 450)
 Illan mac Dúnlainge, king of Leinster (Ireland)

References